The 2018 ICC World Cricket League Division Three was an international cricket tournament that took place in Oman between 9 and 19 November 2018. It formed part of the 2017–19 cycle of the World Cricket League (WCL) which determines the qualification for the 2023 Cricket World Cup. The top two teams were promoted to the 2019 ICC World Cricket League Division Two tournament, and the other four teams will play in the 2019–21 ICC Cricket World Cup Challenge League. It was the first international cricket tournament to be held in Oman.

Tournament hosts Oman were the first team to be promoted to Division Two for 2019, after winning their opening four matches. Oman also won the tournament, after finishing unbeaten in all five of their fixtures. It was the first time this had happened in the WCL since Jersey won the Division Five tournament in 2014. The United States were the other team to be promoted, after they beat Singapore in the final match of the tournament. It was the first time that the United States had gained promotion to Division Two of the WCL.

Teams
Six teams qualified for the tournament:

  (5th in 2018 ICC World Cricket League Division Two)
  (6th in 2018 ICC World Cricket League Division Two)
  (3rd in 2017 ICC World Cricket League Division Three)
  (4th in 2017 ICC World Cricket League Division Three)
  (1st in 2018 ICC World Cricket League Division Four)
  (2nd in 2018 ICC World Cricket League Division Four)

Preparation
Kenya and Uganda took part in the 2018 Africa T20 Cup in September in South Africa. Both sides remained in the country after the tournament ended, playing warm-up fixtures to prepare for the WCL. Kenya played matches against KwaZulu-Natal Inland and Uganda faced the South African Academy in 50-over matches. Kenya also played limited overs fixtures against the Marylebone Cricket Club (MCC), who toured the country in October 2018. The Kenyan team had threatened to boycott the tournament in a row over funding, but payment was made to the players just prior to the start of the competition. The United States took part in the 2018–19 Regional Super50 tournament in the West Indies.

Squads

Ibrahim Khaleel was dropped as the captain of the United States squad and replaced by Saurabh Netravalkar. Sunny Sohal was ruled out of the tournament with an injury and was replaced by Nisarg Patel in the United States' squad. Ahead of the tournament, Collins Obuya was ruled out of Kenya's squad due to personal commitments. He was replaced by Narendra Kalyan, with Shem Ngoche named as captain of the team. Twinkal Bhandari was added to Oman's squad, replacing Khawar Ali, who suffered an injury during Oman's match with Denmark.

Points table

Fixtures
The following fixtures were confirmed in October 2018.

References

External links
 Series home at ESPN Cricinfo

2018, 3
International cricket competitions in 2018–19
2018 in Omani sport
International cricket competitions in Oman